LÉ William Butler Yeats (P63) is a  of the Irish Naval Service. Named after poet W. B. Yeats, the ship is the third in a series of vessels designed by Vard Marine and built by Babcock Marine Appledore. The ship was floated out of the shipyard in March 2016, started trials in July 2016, and arrived at Haulbowline naval base in late July 2016. The ship was formally commissioned in a ceremony in Galway on 17 October 2016. During the ceremony it was officially named by a granddaughter of the poet, Caitriona Yeats.

Operational history
In March 2020 the Naval Service provided the vessel to the HSE as a testing centre to be docked at Galway as part of Irish response to the coronavirus pandemic.

References

2016 ships
Ships built in Devon
Samuel Beckett-class offshore patrol vessels